Yosef Mizrachi (born 1968) is a Haredi rabbi and public speaker. He has been widely denounced and characterised as being misguided by leading Orthodox Jewish authorities.

Early life and career 
Yosef Mizrachi was born in Israel. His father was Moroccan and his mother was Persian. As a young man, he performed mandatory military service in the Israel Defense Forces, later pursuing a career in the financial sector. In 1994, Mizrachi became involved in Jewish outreach, and a year later began to distribute free compact discs and DVDs of his lectures. In 1997, he began learning and teaching Torah at Yeshivat Ohr Yisrael in Monsey, New York. In 2004, his videos started appearing on the internet.

Mizrachi directs prospective converts to Judaism to learn and adopt Jewish observance.

Controversies

COVID-19 
In April 2020, during the COVID-19 pandemic, Mizrachi claimed that blowing hot air from a hair dryer into the throat was a cure for coronavirus. He recommended this treatment five times a day for two days for confirmed cases, and twice a day for suspected cases.

Down syndrome and autism as punishment 
In early 2014, before a lecture tour in London, concern was expressed about statements by Mizrachi in his previous lectures relating to the behaviour of secular and religious Jews during the Holocaust suggesting that Down Syndrome and autism are "punishments for sins committed in a previous life" and among others. Mizrachi responded saying he was taken out of context and he would never disrespect people with disabilities. As a result, at least one of his planned lectures in London was initially cancelled.

Holocaust revisionism 
Mizrachi has claimed that Jews helped bring about the Holocaust by assimilating.

In December 2015, in one of his lectures, Mizrachi claimed that it is possible that only one million Jews were murdered in the Holocaust as opposed to the well accepted figure of 6 million, since many of them were not Jewish according to Jewish law which requires a person's mother to be Jewish. He was criticized by academics and Jewish leaders including Efraim Zuroff, director of the Simon Wiesenthal Center, who said that he "made up history to suit an agenda." Later Mizrachi issued an apology.

Pittsburgh synagogue shooting 
After hearing a false report that the October 2018 Pittsburgh synagogue shooting took place during a bris ceremony for the son of a gay couple, Mizrachi blamed the shooting on the allegedly sinful behavior of the congregation.

Condemnation and banning 
In 2016, UK Chief Rabbi Ephraim Mirvis spoke out against the plans of this "Jewish hate preacher" to visit Britain. Mizrachi has been barred from entering the UK by the Home Office.

In December 2016, 16 prominent US rabbis issued an open letter about Mizrachi, saying that he "reduce[s] complex issues to simplistic and misleading sound bites," and that his assertions are "objectionable, and even dangerous." The letter continued that institutions should be more "discerning" with the guests they invite.

In March 2019, a planned visit by Mizrachi to the UK was canceled following reports that the Home Office was considering a ban on account of his track record of spreading hatred and extremism. Mizrachi went on to blame Rabbi Ephraim Mirvis - referring to him as "the number one most wicked person in the whole world", along with senior Sephardi rabbi Joseph Dweck, claiming that they are "the two friends, gay lovers, who do everything they can to promote homosexuality and destroy the Jewish nation from inside, destroy the Jewish community in England... he's going to bring a Holocaust on the Jews in England."

In July 2020, a video from Mizrachi calling 14 prominent rabbis infidels was removed from social media platforms and prompted calls to have his videos removed more broadly from Jewish sites such as Torah Anytime for fear that it will incite violence. Natan Slifkin, one of the rabbis threatened in the video said, "We need to protest this hateful, potentially violence-inciting rhetoric."

Personal life 
Mizrachi is a resident of Monsey, New York.

References

External links 
 

1968 births
21st-century American rabbis
American Haredi rabbis
Baalei teshuva
Israeli emigrants to the United States
Israeli Orthodox rabbis
People from Monsey, New York
Sephardi rabbis
Living people